Nogometni klub Mons Claudius, commonly referred to as NK Mons Claudius or simply Mons Claudius, is a Slovenian football club from Rogatec. The club was established in 1992.

History

History of football in Rogatec dates back to 1938, when the club named NK Bratstvo was founded. In 1975, NK Bratstvo finished first in the Celje Regional League, which was the sixth tier in the Yugoslav football system. After the dissolution of Yugoslavia, the club changed its name to NK Mons Claudius in 1992. Since then, the club has mostly played in the lower divisions between the Styrian Regional League and the Slovenian Third League.

League history

References

Association football clubs established in 1992
Football clubs in Slovenia
1992 establishments in Slovenia